The Los Angeles Zoo and Botanical Gardens is a  zoo founded in 1966 and located in Los Angeles, California. The city of Los Angeles owns the zoo, its land and facilities, and the animals. Animal care, grounds maintenance, construction, education, public information, and administrative staff are city employees. As of June 2019, Denise M. Verret serves as the zoo's director,  the first female African American director of an Association of Zoos and Aquariums-accredited institution.

History

The first zoo, called Eastlake Zoo, opened in Eastlake Park (renamed Lincoln Park in 1917) in 1885. Remnants of the original zoo remain. The site of the current zoo was formerly the location of Rodger Young Village, which was itself built on the land which had been used for the Griffith Park Aerodrome.

The zoo opened in its present location on November 28, 1966.

By the early 1990s, the zoo's infrastructure was deteriorating. In January 1992, a ten-inch water pipe burst, leaving half of the zoo without water. The next day, city officials passed a $300 million master plan that had been recently drafted to deal with the infrastructure problems and inadequate exhibits. The zoo nearly lost its accreditation in 1995 because of numerous health and safety violation; it rebounded under a new director. The number of species exhibited has been reduced from 400 in 1993 to around 280, coinciding with construction of larger naturalistic enclosures holding animals in bigger groups.

In 1998, the zoo opened Chimpanzees of the Mahale Mountains, followed by Red Ape RainForest in 2000, the Komodo Dragon Exhibit, the Winnick Family Children Zoo in 2001, the Entry Plaza, Children's Discovery Center and Sea Lion Cliffs (now Sea Life Cliffs) in 2005, Campo Gorilla Reserve in November 2007, Elephants of Asia in the winter of 2010, and the LAIR (Living Amphibians, Invertebrates, and Reptiles) in 2012.

On June 26, 2012, a chimpanzee infant baby, born to Gracie, a member of a 15-chimpanzee tribe (one of the largest chimpanzee tribes of any North American zoo), was mauled to death by an adult male chimpanzee. The zoo said this event was totally unexpected, although it also stated that acts of aggression by male chimpanzees (toward humans, or toward a rival male chimpanzee over territory or a desired female) are always a possibility—indeed, there have been several well-known cases of male chimpanzee aggression in recent years. Gracie was allowed to keep her baby overnight to grieve, and counseling was being offered to staff (none had witnessed the event), and to the visitors who had seen the event. It is reexamining its policy of how it introduces baby chimpanzees to the tribe.

Escapes
The Los Angeles Zoo has had a number of notable escaped animals over the years. A particular spate of escapes took place during the late 1990s and early 2000s when, in half a decade, at least 35 animals escaped the zoo including zebras, chimps, kangaroos and antelopes.

Evelyn, the gorilla, escaped her enclosure approximately five times. In one widely covered incident, she used some overgrown vines to pull herself out of her exhibit. She then had full run of the zoo for an hour as TV-news copters hovered overhead and visitors were evacuated before she was tranquilized. In a prior incident, she hopped on the back of another gorilla, Jim, to make her escape (Jim had also previously escaped). Part of the problem was that the gorilla habitat was originally intended to house bears; this was alleviated by the opening of a specially designed Campo Gorilla Reserve in 2007.

In 1979, Virginia, a wolf, escaped the zoo multiple times by ascending trees, climbing fences, and walking along branches until she could escape. At one time she eluded capture for a month by hiding in Griffith Park. It is unclear whether Virginia was ever recaptured.

In 2014, a bighorn sheep escaped from its enclosure, and ultimately the zoo itself. It was struck by a car approximately three hours later and subsequently died.

In 2016, Killarney the koala was killed by P-22, the cougar that lived in Griffith Park.

Exhibits and attractions

Botanical Gardens
In 2002, the zoo became a certified botanical garden and the official name of the institution was changed to the Los Angeles Zoo and Botanical Gardens. Spread throughout zoo grounds, there are 15 different collections, highlighting over 800 different plant species, with a total of over 7,400 individual plants.

Chimpanzees of Mahale Mountains
Chimpanzees of Mahale Mountains, a one-acre (0.4-ha) exhibit complex, opened in 1998 and houses chimpanzees. The hillside exhibit is dotted with boulders, palm trees, and an artificial termite mound, and features a waterfall next to a tall rock ledge where the troop's leader can survey much of the area. Guests can view the animals across various moats or through a glass viewing window.

Campo Gorilla Reserve

Campo Gorilla Reserve opened in November 2007 and features western lowland gorillas in a  complex. Guests can view the animals through two glass observation windows and three other locations. On January 18, 2020, an endangered western lowland gorilla was born at the Los Angeles Zoo, the first to be born there in over two decades. Plants in the exhibit include palms, pomegranates, and ferns.

Elephants of Asia
Not to be confused with Singapore Zoo’s Elephants of Asia, this $42 million exhibit complex at the center of the zoo opened in 2010 and houses Asian elephants and other southeast Asian wildlife. The complex is divided into several areas, each based on a different country in the elephants' range. The Thai Pavilion teaches visitors about the role of elephant labor in Thailand's economy. Guests can find information about elephant conservation in India at Elephants of India Plaza, which also has a waterfall where the animals can bathe. The Elephants of China section houses sarus crane and Chinese water deer in a marsh habitat and has information about the history of the Dai people and their relationship with elephants.

The LAIR
The LAIR (Living Amphibians, Invertebrates, and Reptiles), which opened in 2012, is a $14 million indoor-outdoor exhibit complex that focuses on herps and terrestrial arthropods. Guests first pass through the Oak Woodland Pond, where local species can move in and live among native plants. The next feature is the  main building where the Damp Forest houses poison dart frogs, Chinese giant salamanders, and a recreation of a Daintree Rainforest river with archerfish, Australian lungfish, and Fly River turtles. The Mangshan pitviper, west African green mamba, South American bushmaster and other snakes live in the next segment of the building, Betty's Bite and Squeeze Room, named after Greater Los Angeles Zoo Association co-chair Betty White. Guests can see keepers care for animals behind the scenes in the Behind the Glass room. The Care and Conservation Room showcases Gray's monitor and other endangered reptiles. After the main building is Arroyo Lagarto, a set of outdoor exhibits for Madagascar radiated tortoise, Madagascar spider tortoise, desert lizards, and California desert tortoise. A  secondary building, the Desert LAIR, houses the Gila monster, Sonoran toad, Arizona Desert hairy scorpion, California kingsnake, and other species from Mexico, Arizona, and Southern California. The LAIR ends with Crocodile Swamp, an outdoor exhibit home to false gharials.

Red Ape Rain Forest

Red Ape Rain Forest, a recreation of a Southeast Asian jungle, opened in 2000 and houses Bornean orangutans. The  mesh enclosure, which has openings for the guest path to go through, is shaped like a horizontal donut and back-dropped by hibiscus, bamboo, and rubber trees. The apes can climb on artificial sway poles, branches, and vines placed throughout the exhibit or wade in a shallow stream. Visitors enter the exhibit through an Indonesian pagoda, continue over the stream on a deck bridge, and arrive at a small pavilion with a glass viewing window. The path next leads to a large central deck where guests can view the entirety of the surrounding exhibit. Afterwards, guests proceed to an interpretive area with traditional Indonesian folklore and exit the exhibit area through another pagoda.

Rainforest of the Americas
Rainforest of the Americas features animals who live in the tropical regions of North, Central, and South America. It opened in 2014 and houses the uakari, southern black howler monkey, red-bellied piranha, keel-billed toucan, harpy eagle, Goliath bird-eating spider, giant river otter, emerald tree boa, cotton-top tamarin, Baird's tapir, jaguar and other species.

List of animal species
As of 2022:

Birds

 Abyssinian ground hornbill
 African fish eagle
 African sacred ibis
 Andean condor
 Bald eagle
 Bateleur
 Black crowned crane
 Black vulture
 Blue-and-yellow macaw
 Blue-billed curassow
 Blue-throated macaw
 Bufflehead
 California condor
 Chicken
 Chilean flamingo
 Common ostrich
 Congo peafowl
 Crested caracara
 Crested oropendola
 Eurasian eagle owl
 Galah
 Great horned owl
 Greater flamingo
 Greater roadrunner
 Green aracari
 Grey crowned crane
 Harpy eagle
 Harris's hawk
 Hyacinth macaw
 Indian peafowl
 King vulture
 Lanner falcon
 Laughing kookaburra
 Military macaw
 Nicobar pigeon
 Pygmy falcon  
 Red-fronted macaw
 Red-legged seriema
 Red-tailed black cockatoo
 Red-tailed hawk
 Rhinoceros hornbill
 Rock dove
 Ross's turaco
 Salmon-crested cockatoo
 Sarus crane
 Scarlet macaw
 Southern cassowary
 Steller's sea eagle
 Sunbittern
 Wrinkled hornbill
 Violet turaco
 Village weaver
 Von der Decken's hornbill
 White-crowned robin-chat
 White-faced whistling duck
 Yellow-naped amazon

Mammals

 Addax
 African wild dog
 American badger
 American black bear
 Baird's tapir
 Bat-eared fox
 Binturong
 Black duiker
 Black howler
 Blue-eyed black lemur
 Bongo
 Bornean orangutan
 Calamian deer
 California sea lion
 Cape porcupine
 Chacoan peccary
 Chimpanzee
 Chinese goral
 Common squirrel monkey
 Crested capuchin
 Desert bighorn sheep
 Fennec fox
 Fossa
 Four-toed hedgehog
 François' langur
 Geoffroy's spider monkey
 Gerenuk
 Giant anteater
 Giant otter
 Grevy's zebra
 Guinea pig
 Harbor seal
 Indian elephant
 Jaguar
 Koala
 Lesser kudu
 Linnaeus's two-toed sloth
 Lowland paca
 Mandrill
 Maned wolf
 Mantled guereza
 Masai giraffe
 Meerkat
 Mountain tapir
 Nigerian dwarf goat
 North Sulawesi babirusa
 Ocelot
 Okapi
 Peninsular pronghorn
 Red-capped mangabey
 Red river hog
 Red-rumped agouti
 Reeves's muntjac
 Ringtail
 Ring-tailed lemur
 Rock hyrax
 Serval
 Shetland sheep
 Short-beaked echidna
 Siamang
 Sichuan takin
 Snow leopard
 Southern hairy-nosed wombat
 Southern pudu
 Sumatran tiger
 Tadjik markhor
 Tammar wallaby
 Vietnamese pot-bellied pig
 Visayan warty pig
 Western gray kangaroo
 Western lowland gorilla
 White-faced saki
 Yellow-backed duiker
 Yellow-cheeked gibbon
 Yellow-footed rock-wallaby

Reptiles and amphibians

 Aldabra giant tortoise
 American alligator
 Arizona mountain kingsnake
 Armenian viper
 Aruba rattlesnake
 Axolotl
 Baja California rat snake
 Banded rock rattlesnake
 Blessed poison frog
 Boelen's python
 Boyd's forest dragon
 California kingsnake
 Cape cobra
 Chinese giant salamander
 Colorado River toad
 Common chuckwalla
 Desert iguana
 Desert rosy boa
 Desert tortoise
 Dyeing poison dart frog
 Ethiopian mountain viper
 False gharial
 Fringed leaf frog
 Gaboon viper
 Gharial
 Giant horned lizard
 Gila monster
 Golden poison frog
 Gopher snake
 Gray-banded kingsnake
 Gray's monitor
 Green and black poison dart frog
 Iranian harlequin newt
 Komodo dragon
 Long-nosed viper
 Madagascar giant day gecko
 Magnificent tree frog
 Mangrove viper
 Mangshan pit viper
 Mexican west coast rattlesnake
 Mertens' water monitor
 Mexican beaded lizard
 Northern caiman lizard
 Painted terrapin
 Perentie
 Pig-nosed turtle
 Radiated tortoise
 Red diamond rattlesnake
 Red-eyed tree frog
 Ridge-nosed rattlesnake
 Rock rattlesnake
 Rough-scaled python
 Santa Catalina rattlesnake
 Shingleback skink
 Sidewinder
 Southern American bushmaster
 Speckled rattlesnake
 Spider tortoise
 Temple viper
 Tiger salamander
 Western green mamba
 Yellow-banded poison dart frog
 Zimmerman's poison frog

Fish
 Armored catfish
 Australian rainbowfish
 Banded archerfish
 Bucktooth tetra
 Lake Wanam rainbowfish
 Ocellate river stingray
 Red-bellied piranha
 Red rainbowfish
 Tami River rainbowfish
 Xingu River ray

Invertebrates
 Giant desert hairy scorpion
 Madagascar hissing cockroach
 Sunburst diving beetle

Conservation
The Los Angeles Zoo has been successful in its breeding program of the rare California condor, helping to grow the number of condors in the world from a low of 22 in the 1980s to over 430 today. It is one of the few zoos worldwide to have the mountain tapir, and is the only zoo outside of Peru and Brazil to house the red uakari.  It was one of the first zoos to successfully breed echidnas and gave birth to the first Coquerel's sifaka outside of Madagascar, the sifaka's native homeland.

Greater Los Angeles Zoo Association
The Greater Los Angeles Zoo Association (GLAZA) was created in 1963 and is a nonprofit corporation created to support the Los Angeles Zoo in its mission to nurture wildlife and enrich the human experience. GLAZA's primary responsibility is to seek and provide financial support for the zoo's programs and capital projects. GLAZA also provides support through membership, organizing special events and travel programs, producing award-winning publications, coordinating one of the largest zoo volunteer programs in the country, administering the contract for visitor services concessions within the zoo, and supporting community relations, and public relations.

Gottlieb Animal Health and Conservation Center
Named after philanthropists Robert and Suzanne Gottlieb, the Gottlieb Animal Health and Conservation Center is a  facility situated in a restricted area in the upper reaches of the zoo. Among other features, it includes a state-of-the-art intensive care unit, an on-site commissary, a surgical suite with observation area, and research facilities. In 2007 the facility handled 853 medical cases. The smallest patient treated was a spider tortoise (0.08 kg) and the largest was an Asian elephant (4,826 kg).

Shows and activities

California Condor Rescue Zone (CCRZ): The CCRZ is a play space designed for children ages 6 and up, where they can learn how California condors are protected. The area also features live webcam feeds of the California Condors, which are not currently exhibited because of the sensitive nature of the rescue work.

World of Birds Show: Birds of prey and other endangered birds perform. Show times: 11:30am and 3:30pm, daily, except Tuesdays. The World of Birds Show is currently running but the birds are still in training.

Animals & You Program: These 15-minute-long animal presentations take place at stations in the Winnick Family Children's Zoo.

Winnick Family Children's Zoo: Located at the top of Winnick Family Children's Zoo, this petting zoo enables visitors to pet goats and sheep in an animal contact area known as Muriel's Ranch. Brushes are available at Muriel's Ranch for visitors to groom the domestic animals.

Neil Papiano Play Park: The Neil Papiano Play Park (located in the upper zoo along the perimeter road) incorporates animal-themed climbing sculptures, large play structures, a toddler area, water misters, grassy landscaping, and a large picnic area. It was designed to be accessible to all children visiting the zoo, including those with medical and physical challenges.

Los Angeles Zoo Magnet Center

The North Hollywood High School Zoo Magnet Center is located across the street from the Los Angeles Zoo and Botanical Gardens in Griffith Park. The program was established in 1981 in the hopes of "a vision of providing a racially, ethnically, economically, and geographically diverse group of motivated students an enriched curriculum in animal and biological sciences." The Zoo Magnet Center offers 300 Los Angeles high school students a college preparatory curriculum focused on animal studies and biological sciences. It is also run by the Los Angeles Unified School District.

The Los Angeles Zoo and Botanical Garden's partnership with the Zoo Magnet Center provides high school students with opportunities to study and to practice wildlife conservation, animal care, biology, chemistry, and environmental stewardship in a hands-on environment.

See also

 John C. Holland, Los Angeles City Council member, 1943–67, opposed turning the zoo over to a private organization

References

External links 

 
 The Old Griffith Park Zoo on Modern Day Ruins
 Image of zookeepers holding lion cubs at the California Zoological Gardens (later known as the Griffith Park Zoo), Los Angeles, 1935. Los Angeles Times Photographic Archive (Collection 1429). UCLA Library Special Collections, Charles E. Young Research Library, University of California, Los Angeles.
 Image of zebras at the California Zoological Gardens (later known as the Griffith Park Zoo), Los Angeles, 1935. Los Angeles Times Photographic Archive (Collection 1429). UCLA Library Special Collections, Charles E. Young Research Library, University of California, Los Angeles.
 LA zoo lights

1966 establishments in California
Griffith Park
Landmarks in Los Angeles
Los Feliz, Los Angeles
Tourist attractions in Los Angeles
Zoos established in 1966
Zoos in California